Ain't My Lookout is the fourth full-length album by Memphis indie rock band The Grifters, and their first for Sub Pop Records. While Sub Pop released the Compact Disc, the Grifters remained true to their old home, Shangri-La Records, which was able to receive the licensing for the vinyl release. The vinyl LP release is now out of print. The album marked a stylistic change in the band's sound, with the lo-fi sound featured on previous albums being devoid on this release.

Critical reception 
The album received generally favorable reviews. The album was given a 6/10 by Stephen Thomas Erlewine of AllMusic, describing it as their 'tightest and cleanest' record to date. While stating that despite the higher production value, the band still stay committed to their lo-fi sound and refrain from selling out. Christgau also describes the effort as “Southern-fried hipsters uproot some pavement.” The album received a 2-star honorable mention, describing it as a “likable effort consumers attuned to its overriding aesthetic or individual vision may well enjoy.”

Track listing

Album credits

Grifters
 Stanley Gallimore
 Tripp Lamkins
 Dave Shouse
 Scott Taylor

Additional musicians
 Joan Wasser (Dambuilders) – Violin on “Fixed In The Sky” and “Radio City Suicide”
 Michael Graber (Professor Elixir's Southern Troubadours) – Mandolin on “Pretty Notes”
 Paulette Regan (Professor Elixir's Southern Troubadours) – Vocals on “Pretty Notes”
 Davis McCain – Guitar on “Last Man Alive”

Additional credits
 Cover art and illustrations by Jim Woodring Hillbilly Rampage
 Photography by Dan Ball

References

External links
 "Last Man Alive" music video

Grifters (band) albums
1996 albums
Sub Pop albums